Hari kurk (or Hari Kurk Strait) is a strait in Estonia, locating between Hiiumaa and Vormsi; this strait is part of Väinameri.

Strait's width is 10-13 km, depth mostly some meters.

Several islets are located in the strait: eg Hellamaa rahu, Kadakalaid.

References

Geography of Estonia